The New Zealand Meritorious Service Medal is a meritorious and long service award for members of the New Zealand Defence Force. Initially established on 28 April 1898 as the Meritorious Service Medal (New Zealand), only members of the New Zealand Army were eligible for award. In 1985, a Royal Warrant established the current criteria for the medal making all members of the Army, Navy, and Air Force eligible for the award.  Members of the defence forces above the rank of sergeant, who have at least 21 years of service, and hold their service's Long Service and Good Conduct Medal are eligible for the medal. The New Zealand Meritorious Service Medal is to be replaced by the New Zealand Defence Meritorious Service Medal, though holders of the superseded medal are still entitled to continue wearing it.

Appearance

The medal is silver and circular in shape.  The obverse bears the effigy of the Sovereign of New Zealand, surrounded by the inscription ELIZABETH II DEI GRATIA REGINA FID. DEF. The reverse bears the inscription For Meritorious Service surrounded by a laurel wreath, surmounted by a royal crown.  Above the crown is the inscription New Zealand.

The medal is suspended by a ribbon, 32 mm in width, of crimson with a narrow centre stripe of green.

References

Military awards and decorations of New Zealand
New Zealand Meritorious & Long Service Awards
Long and Meritorious Service Medals of Britain and the Commonwealth